Lǐ Xuǎn (李選) was a Tang dynasty prince and Tang Daizong's eleventh son. His mother's identity is unknown.

Li Xuan died early.

In the year 781 he was given the posthumous title Prince of Jing (荊王) by his brother and emperor Tang Dezong.

Tang dynasty imperial princes